The 44th Kerala Film Critics Association Awards, honouring the best Malayalam films released in 2020, were announced in September 2021.

Winners

Main Awards 
Best Film: The Great Indian Kitchen
Best Actor: Prithviraj Sukumaran and Biju Menon - Ayyappanum Koshiyum
Best Actress: Surabhi Lakshmi - Jwalamukhi and Samyuktha Menon - Aanum Pennum, Vellam, Wolf
Best Director: Sidhartha Siva - Ennivar
Second Best Film: Vellam
Second Best Director: Prajesh Sen - Vellam
Best Supporting Actor: Sudheesh - Ennivar
Best Supporting Actress: Mamitha Baiju - Kho-Kho
Best Child Artiste Male: Master Sidhartha - Bonamy
Best Child Artiste Female: Baby Krishna Sree - Kanthi
Best Screenplay: Sachy - Ayyappanum Koshiyum
Best Music Director: M. Jayachandran - Sufiyum Sujatayum
Best Lyricist: Engandiyoor Chandrasekharan - Randam Naal
Best Male Playback Singer: P. K. Sunilkumar - Sheriyathu from the movie Perfume
Best Female Playback Singer: K. S. Chithra - Neelavanam from the movie Perfume
Best Cinematographer: Amal Neerad - Trance
Best Film Editor: Naufal Abdullah - Sameer
Best Sound Designer: Resul Pookutty - Trance
Best Art Director: Deepu Joseph - Sufiyum Sujatayum
Best Makeup Artist: Sudhi Surendran - Ek Din
Best Costumer: Mehar Hamsa - Trance
Best Popular Film: Sufiyum Sujatayum
Best Biopic Film: Visudha Chavara Achan
Best Children's Film: Bonamy
Best Ecological Film: Orilathanalil
Best Performing Artist Film: Pacha Thappu and Uriyattu
Best Sanskrit Film: Bhagavaddajjukam
Best Debutant Actor: Anand Roshan - Sameer
Best Debutant Actress: Afsana - Velutha Madhuram
Best Debutant Director: Viyaan Vishnu - Ek Din

Sepcial Jury Awards 
Best Director: Zeenath - Randu Naal and Jinoy Jebit - Kozhipporu
Best Lyricist: Anilkumar - Leika
Socially Relevant Best Film: Kho-Kho, Sameer and Article-21

Honourary Awards 
 Chalachitra Ratnam Award: K. G. George
 Ruby Jubilee Award: Harikumar
 Chalachitra Prathibha Award: Mamukkoya, Sai Kumar, Bindu Panicker

References

External links
 "List of recipients of the Kerala Film Critics Association Awards" (in Malayalam)
 "Kerala Film Critics Association Awards 2020: Official press release" (in Malayalam)

2020 Indian film awards
2020